"It Must Have Been Love", originally "It Must Have Been Love (Christmas for the Broken Hearted)", is a song written by Per Gessle and performed by the Swedish pop duo Roxette. The power ballad became the duo's third number one hit in the United States, and is one of their best selling releases, being certified gold or platinum in a number of countries.

Four different versions of the song have been officially released. The original song was released in 1987, which was followed by the most successful incarnation, a slightly edited version, omitting the Christmas references, created for the soundtrack to the 1990 film Pretty Woman. During the "Join the Joyride! World Tour" in 1991, the band recorded a country music version in Los Angeles, included on their 1992 album Tourism. A Spanish-language version of the Pretty Woman recording was released on their 1996 compilation Baladas en Español. Finally, an orchestral live performance from the band's 2009 concert at Night of the Proms was included on their 2012 studio album, Travelling.

Original release (1987)
The song was first released as "It Must Have Been Love (Christmas for the Broken Hearted)" in December 1987. It was composed after EMI Germany asked the duo to "come up with an intelligent Christmas single". It became a top five hit in Sweden, but was not released internationally. This version of the song was never included on any Roxette studio album until the 1997 re-release of their debut Pearls of Passion (1986).

Music video
A performance from a Swedish TV chart show in 1987 acted as the song's first music video. It features Fredriksson and Gessle sitting on a couch on a stage, lip-syncing to the song.

Formats and track listings
All songs written and composed by Per Gessle, except where noted.

 7-inch single (Sweden 1362887)
 "It Must Have Been Love (Christmas for the Broken Hearted)" – 4:48
 "Turn to Me" – 2:58 (Music by Marie Fredriksson)

Charts

Re-release (1990)

During a run of increasingly successful singles from the duo's 1988 album Look Sharp!, Touchstone Pictures approached Roxette and their label about contributing a song to the soundtrack of the upcoming romantic comedy release Pretty Woman, starring Richard Gere and Julia Roberts. The film was released in March 1990 and went on to make more than US$460 million at the worldwide box office. The corresponding soundtrack album was also a commercial success, which was certified triple-platinum in the US. The soundtrack went on to sell more than nine million copies worldwide.

Critical reception
Bill Coleman from Billboard described the song as a "rhythmic ballad". Dave Sholin from the Gavin Report wrote: "Per and Marie are on target again. Per Gessle continues to demonstrate his uncanny ability to compose exceptional pop melodies and Marie Fredriksson makes the words and music jump through the speakers. Though timed to coincide with the release of the Julia Roberts/Richard Gere film Pretty Woman, this tune from the soundtrack could easily stand on its own. Interest in the movie only gives it that much more of a boost". Dave Simpson from The Guardian said the song is a "masterpiece of pain". He added that "Fredriksson's genius is in delivering the title line clean and stoic, rather than with tortured vibrato, to show that she's resigned to her fate. But with the jarringly urgent upward key change in the middle eight, the pain floods in again, and she's back to square one". A reviewer from Liverpool Echo wrote: "It's a ballad, it's big in America, but it's not as heavy-handed as the usual US success. Funnily enough, there even seems to be a bit of an ABBA influence in there". Refinery29 included it at number 39 on their list of The Saddest Breakup Songs of All Time, saying the track "represents the perfect ratio of schlock to sentiment. In someone like Celine Dion's hands, this would have been a complete disaster, but the Swedish duo gaze off to 'where the water flows' and 'where the wind blows' without sounding like '90s Disney characters". Brendon Veevers from Renowned for Sound noted the song as a "timeless power ballad that has aged like a fine wine".

Commercial performance
A re-written and edited version of the track – the lyric "It's a hard Christmas day" was changed to "It's a hard winter's day", twenty seconds were removed from the intro, as well as 24 seconds from the outro – became an international hit during the summer of 1990. It was not the first single released from the Pretty Woman soundtrack, but it became the most successful, spending two weeks at the top spot of the Billboard Hot 100 in June. The song was certified Gold by the RIAA for sales in excess of 500,000 copies in the US. At the end of the year, Billboard listed it as the second most successful single of 1990, behind Wilson Phillips' "Hold On".

The single peaked at number three in the UK—their highest-peaking single there. It stayed on the UK Singles Chart for 14 weeks, and was certified gold by the BPI for sales and streams in excess of 400,000. The song was re-released in the UK and Ireland in September 1993 to tie in with the TV premiere of Pretty Woman, peaking at number ten in both countries. It became Roxette's second of three number one singles in Australia, spending two weeks at the top spot in July 1990. The song was a massive hit in Norway, where it spent twelve weeks at number one. In Switzerland, the song spent three non-consecutive weeks at number one, and a further five weeks at number two—being held off the top spot in those weeks by Matthias Reim's "Verdammt, ich lieb' dich". It also reached number one in Canada, Poland and Spain, and the top five in Austria, Belgium, Ireland, Japan, the Netherlands, New Zealand and West Germany, where it spent nine months in the top 75.

In 2005, Gessle received an award from BMI after the song's four millionth radio play in the US. He received updated awards from the same organization after its five millionth radio play in 2014, and its six millionth play in 2021.

Music video
The second video was directed by Doug Freel and was shot in a warehouse. It included clips from Pretty Woman, with Fredriksson singing and playing piano and Gessle playing guitar between various prop changes. There is also an alternate version of the video, without the movie scenes, which was available solely on the VHS The Videos. According to Fredriksson, shooting this video was a surreal experience, as Freel "wanted all movements in slow motion, so I had to lip-sync the vocals at double speed. My first lesson in how to sing an emotional ballad Mickey Mouse style".

As of June 2022, this video has more than 619 million views on YouTube.

Formats and track listings
All songs were written and composed by Gessle, except "Cry", music by Fredriksson and Gessle.

 Australian cassette and 7-inch single (US2399)
 EU cassette and 7-inch single (Germany 006-1363807 · UK EM141)
 "It Must Have Been Love" – 4:20
 "Paint" – 3:29

 US and Canada cassette (4JM-50283)
 "It Must Have Been Love" – 4:20
 "Chances" – 4:07

 EU 12-inch single (Germany 060-1363806 · UK EM141)
 Japanese 3" CD single (TODP-2194)
 "It Must Have Been Love" – 4:20
 "Paint" – 3:29
 "Cry" (Live from Himmelstalundshallen, Norrköping on 16 December 1988) – 5:42

 UK CD single (CDEM141)
 "It Must Have Been Love" – 4:20
 "Paint" – 3:29
 "Cry" (Live from Norrköping) – 5:42
 "Surrender" (Live from Norrköping on 16 December 1988) – 3:07

Charts

Weekly charts

Year-end charts

Certifications

"No Sé Si Es Amor" (1997)

Roxette released a Spanish-language compilation album, Baladas en Español, in 1996. It consisted of twelve of their down-tempo singles and album tracks, which were translated by Spanish songwriter Luis Gomez-Escolar, who would later co-write the Ricky Martin hit "Livin' la Vida Loca". The album was only released in Spanish and Portuguese-speaking territories. An adapted version of "It Must Have Been Love", titled "No Sé Si Es Amor", was released in early 1997 as the album's second and final single. The song wasn't translated, its lyrics are new, with a slight different meaning from the original lyrics.

Formats and track listings
Music and original lyrics by Per Gessle. Spanish lyrics by Luis G. Escolar.

 CD single (EU 8652802)
 "No Sé Si Es Amor" ("It Must Have Been Love") – 4:41
 "Directamente a Ti" ("Run to You") – 3:30

Charts

25th anniversary reissue (2015)
On the twenty-fifth anniversary of the song's release on the Pretty Woman soundtrack, Parlophone released a limited edition red-coloured vinyl on 19 May 2015. This single included the Pretty Woman version of the song, backed with the original 1987 release and the Los Angeles-studio performance (minus the live intro recorded in Santiago, Chile) from their 1992 album Tourism. The latter features pedal steel guitar performed by Greg Leisz, who is best known for his work with k.d. lang. The single was released on digital download stores from 23 March.

Formats and track listings
All songs written and composed by Per Gessle.

 12-inch single (Sweden 0724386504715)
 "It Must Have Been Love" – 4:18
 "It Must Have Been Love (Christmas for the Broken Hearted)" – 4:47
 "It Must Have Been Love" (L.A. Version) – 4:45

Credits and personnel
Credits adapted from the liner notes of the 25th anniversary vinyl re-release.Original studio versionEngineered by Per Gessle, Clarence Öfwerman, Anders Herrlin and Alar Suurna 
Mixed by Alar Suurna (1987) and Humberto Gatica (1990)
 Marie Fredriksson – vocals and piano
 Per Gessle – backing vocals
 Per "Pelle" Alsing – drums
 Jonas Isacsson – guitars
 Clarence Öfwerman – keyboards, Synclavier, programming and productionL.A. version Recorded at Ocean Way Recording, Los Angeles in March 1992 and EMI Studios, Stockholm in May 1992
 Engineered by Mike Ross and Rail Rogut
 Marie Fredriksson – vocals
 Per Gessle – harmonica
 Per "Pelle" Alsing – drums
 Anders Herrlin – bass guitar
 Jonas Isacsson – electric guitar
 Greg Leisz – pedal steel guitar
 Clarence Öfwerman – keyboards
 Mats "MP" Persson – acoustic guitar
 Alar Suurna – tambourine

Other versions
Philly Lutaaya version
In 1989, the late Ugandan musician Philly Lutaaya, who was then based in Sweden used the song to record his hit "Alone and Frightened" on his album "Alone", in which he came out as an HIV/AIDS patient, becoming the first public figure to be identified with the virus/disease during an HIV/AIDS epidemic in Uganda.

Brazilian version
The song was recorded twice in Portuguese, by the duo Gilberto e Gilmar as Outro dia nasceu in 1992, and by the forró band Moleca 100 as Vergonha não sou feliz mais in 2012.

Shirley Bassey version
Shirley Bassey covered the song in 1995 for the album Shirley Bassey Sings the Movies.

Shirley Clamp version
In 2006, Swedish pop singer Shirley Clamp recorded a cover version of the song called "När kärleken föds" ("When Love is Born"), it peaked at number 6 at the Swedish singles chart.

Megan McKenna version

In 2019, English singer Megan McKenna covered "It Must Have Been Love" as the first winner of The X Factor: Celebrity. Following the announcement that she had won, her version of the song was released on 30 November.

Track listing

Charts

Release history

 Karen Harding version

In 2020, English singer Karen Harding covered "It Must Have Been Love'''" on 5 February.

Track listing

Release history

See also
List of European number-one airplay songs of the 1990s

References

External links

1987 singles
1990 singles
1993 singles
2006 singles
Billboard Hot 100 number-one singles
Roxette songs
Shirley Clamp songs
Number-one singles in Australia
Number-one singles in Norway
Number-one singles in Switzerland
Number-one singles in Zimbabwe
RPM Top Singles number-one singles
Songs written by Per Gessle
Pop ballads
Rock ballads
Swedish Christmas songs
1987 songs
1980s ballads
Songs about heartache
EMI Records singles
Syco Music singles